The Clearing is an upcoming Australian television drama series for Disney+. Principal photography began in July 2022.

Cast
 Teresa Palmer
 Miranda Otto
 Guy Pearce 
 Hazem Shammas
 Mark Coles Smith
 Kate Mulvany
  Xavier Samuel
 Claudia Karvan
 Anna Lise Phillips
 Harry Greenwood
 Erroll Shand 
 Doris Younane
 Miah Madden
 Julia Savage 
 Gary Sweet
 Alicia Gardiner 
 Matt Okine 
 Jeremy Blewitt 
 Lily La Torre 
 Ras-Samuel Welda’abzgi
 Berlin Lu

Production
The series is based on the book In The Clearing by J.P. Pomare, and the real-life group The Family. Filming began in Victoria, Australia in July 2022.

References

External links

Television shows filmed in Australia
Television series by Disney